Rocky Branch is a stream in Cass County in the U.S. state of Missouri. It is a tributary of Panther Creek.

Rocky Branch was named for the rocky character of its creek bed.

See also
List of rivers of Missouri

References

Rivers of Cass County, Missouri
Rivers of Missouri